Salumäe is an Estonian surname. Notable people with the surname include:

Erik Salumäe (born 1970), Estonian politician
Erika Salumäe (born 1962), Estonian track bicycle racer and Olympic gold medalist
Jane Salumäe (born 1968), Estonian long-distance runner and Olympic competitor
Jens Salumäe (born March 1981), Estonian ski jumper and Nordic combined skier and Olympic competitor
Priit Salumäe (born 1967), Estonian cyclist
Tiit Salumäe (born 1951), Estonian Lutheran prelate

Estonian-language surnames